Adrian Čeman (born 10 April 1976) is a Slovak football player, currently plays for FC Slovan Galanta.

External links
MFK Karviná Profile

References

1976 births
Living people
Association football defenders
Slovak footballers
FC Nitra players
MFK Karviná players
Expatriate footballers in the Czech Republic
Slovak Super Liga players